Hans-Peter Minetti (21 April 1926 – 10 November 2006) was a German actor. He studied at the Theaterhochschule Leipzig and appeared in more than sixty films from 1954 to 1996.

From 1966 until 1975, he was the president of the Union of Art.

Selected filmography

References

External links 

1926 births
2006 deaths
Theaterhochschule Leipzig alumni
German male film actors